Eduard Leopold Maria Strauss (March 24, 1910 – April 6, 1969), commonly known as Eduard Strauss II to distinguish him from his grandfather, was an Austrian conductor whose grandfather was Eduard Strauss I and whose uncle was Johann Strauss III.

He enrolled at University of Music and Performing Arts, Vienna, and learned composition technique from Franz Schmidt. He debuted as a conductor in 1949, 50 years after the death of Johann Strauss II, and 100 years after the death of Johann Strauss I.

Eduard II visited Japan in 1956. His works drew enormous attention, Johann Strauss boom occurred in Japan.

He organized Wiener Johann Strauss Orchester in 1966.

His son, Eduard Strauss (born 1955) is current Strauss Family head.

filmography 
In 1954, Eduard II appeared in three movies as Eduard Strauss Jr.
Victoria in Dover – a composer.
The Eternal Waltz – Eduard Strauss I.
 – Johann Strauss II.

References 
 Eduard Strauss: Eduard Strauss II: Ein Künstlerleben. Schneider, Tutzing 2010.

External links 

 
WJSO「Eduard Strauss II.」
EJSF「Eduard Strauss II.」

Eduard
1910 births
1969 deaths
Austrian people of Jewish descent
Male conductors (music)
20th-century Austrian conductors (music)
20th-century Austrian male musicians
University of Music and Performing Arts Vienna alumni